The Corinthian 19, also called the Bristol 19, is an American trailerable sailboat that was designed by Carl Alberg as a cruiser and first built in 1966.

Production
The design was initially built by Sailstar Boats in the United States and later by Bristol Yachts after it acquired Sailstar. Bristol sold it as the Bristol 19. Production started in 1966, with over 700 completed, but the boat is now out of production.

Design
The Corinthian 19 is a recreational keelboat, built predominantly of fiberglass, with wood trim. It has a fractional sloop rig; a spooned, raked stem; a raised counter, angled transom; a keel-mounted rudder controlled by a tiller and a fixed long keel. It displaces  and carries  of lead ballast.

The boat is normally fitted with a small  outboard motor for docking and maneuvering. The motor is mounted in a transom well on the port side.

The design has sleeping accommodation for two people, with  two straight settee quarter berths in the main cabin. There are no  galley provisions. The head is located forward in between the two berths.

Operational history
In a 2010 review Steve Henkel wrote, "over 700 of these shippy-looking little sloops were built between 1965 and the early 1980s. Alberg’s designs are so distinctive that his trademark look is hard to miss ... while not usually seen on the racing circuit, like most Alberg designs, this ones a solid, wholesome, forgiving, and easy-to-sail vessel, great for daysailing and overnighting in that harbor a few miles away from your home base. Best features: The Corinthian’s springy sheer, extended overhangs fore and aft, and reasonably good finish make her a pleasure to behold. Her in-the-cockpit engine well (an optional extra when new) offers convenience to the helms-person, and because of her hull shape, keeps propeller cavitation in waves to a minimum. Worst features: Her SA/D of 15.3 is in the 'very low' category, and her D/L of 399 is considered very high, making her relatively slow in light air (but relatively stable in heavy air)."

See also
List of sailing boat types

References

External links

''main.jpg&response-content-type=image/jpeg&X-Amz-Algorithm=AWS4-HMAC-SHA256&X-Amz-Credential=AKIATD3LHKMPV6UWRHOT/20210304/us-east-2/s3/aws4_request&X-Amz-Date=20210304T162359Z&X-Amz-Expires=604800&X-Amz-SignedHeaders=host&X-Amz-Signature=a6ba386d4602600a2a81dbd89a8760b7bb2128548224ba7effa67ffea12118f4 Photo of a Corinthian 19

Keelboats
1960s sailboat type designs
Sailing yachts
Trailer sailers
Sailboat type designs by Carl Alberg
Sailboat types built by Bristol Yachts
Sailboat types built by Sailstar Boats